The Canaan Meetinghouse is a historic meeting house on Canaan Street in Canaan, New Hampshire. Built in 1794, with some subsequent alterations, it is a good example of a Federal period meeting house, serving as a center of town civic and religious activity for many years. The building was listed on the National Register of Historic Places in 1972, and included in the Canaan Street Historic District the following year. The building is still owned by the town, and is available for rent.

Description and history
The Canaan Meetinghouse is located at the southwest corner of Canaan Street and Apple Blossom Road, overlooking Canaan Street Lake to the east. It is a 2½-story wood-frame structure, with a gabled roof and clapboarded exterior. A square tower projects from the short front side, rising  to a clock stage and open octagonal belfry. The current main entrance is at the base of the tower, framed by pilasters and a corniced entablature; the original main entrance is located at the center of the long south side, with a slightly simpler surround. The interior is outfitted with bench pews, a replacement for the original box pews, and the gallery level has been covered over to provide a full second story.

The Federal-style building was constructed for use as a church in the mid-1790s. It was also used for town meetings from an early date, and was purchased by the town in 1829, at which time it was reoriented to have the entrance on the short end. Originally built with projecting stairwells on the short sides, one of the stairwells was mounted on top of the other to create the tower after the town bought the building. In 1841 the upper gallery was converted to a full second floor, intended for use as a church space by the local Baptist congregation.

See also
National Register of Historic Places listings in Grafton County, New Hampshire

References

External links

Community Meeting Spaces - Town of Canaan

Churches on the National Register of Historic Places in New Hampshire
Federal architecture in New Hampshire
Churches completed in 1794
Churches in Grafton County, New Hampshire
Historic district contributing properties in New Hampshire
National Register of Historic Places in Grafton County, New Hampshire
Canaan, New Hampshire
1794 establishments in the United States